James Anderson Peddie was a Scottish writer, mostly of non-fiction. He wrote Capture of London (1887), about London being invaded via a Channel Tunnel.

Works
 Capture of London (London: General Publishing Co, 1887) 
 (ed.) Cast Ashore on Christmas Eve (London: Newsagents' Pub Co, 1868) [anth: chap: Club Story: pb/]
''The Registered Letter"

References

External links 

 Works by James Peddie at Project Gutenberg
 

Scottish non-fiction writers
Scottish novelists
Scottish science fiction writers